Vaitkus is the masculine form of a Lithuanian family name. Its feminine forms  are: Vaitkienė (married woman or widow) and Vaitkutė (unmarried woman). It is derived from the personal name Vaitkus, from Polish Wojtek, which is a diminutive of the Polish given name Wojciech.

The surname may refer to:

Jonas Vaitkus (born 1944), Lithuanian theatre and film director
Rimantas Vaitkus, First Deputy Chancellor of Lithuania
Tomas Vaitkus (born 1982), Lithuanian professional road racing cyclist
, Lithuanian singer, instrumentalist, participated in Lithuanian Eurovision Song Contest 2013 to win 2nd place
Felix Waitkus (1907-1956), American pilot

References

Lithuanian-language surnames
Surnames of Polish origin